Víctor Martín Galain Pécora (born March 2, 1989 in Florida, Uruguay) is an Uruguayan footballer currently playing for El Tanque Sisley.

Galain began playing football in Club Nacional de Football's youth system, and was called into the senior side in July 2008.

Teams
  Nacional 2008-2010
  Tacuarembó FC 2010-2011
  El Tanque Sisley 2011-2012
  La Equidad 2013
  El Tanque Sisley 2014–present

Titles
  Nacional 2008/09 (Uruguayan Primera División Championship), 2010 (Copa Bimbo)

References

External links
 Profile at BDFA 
 

1989 births
Living people
People from Florida Department
Uruguayan people of Basque descent
Uruguayan footballers
Uruguayan expatriate footballers
Uruguayan Primera División players
Categoría Primera A players
Bolivian Primera División players
La Equidad footballers
Tacuarembó F.C. players
El Tanque Sisley players
Club Nacional de Football players
Club Real Potosí players
Expatriate footballers in Colombia
Expatriate footballers in Bolivia

Association football defenders